Humewood Road railway station is a railway station located in Humewood, Port Elizabeth, South Africa.

The Humewood Road-Humansdorp section of the Avontuur Railway was opened on November, 1905.

References

Buildings and structures in Port Elizabeth
Railway stations in South Africa
Transport in the Eastern Cape